Shoreham may refer to:

Places

Australia
 Shoreham, Victoria

United Kingdom 
 Shoreham, Kent
 Shoreham railway station
 Shoreham-by-Sea, West Sussex
 Shoreham (UK Parliament constituency) 1974-1997
 New Shoreham (UK Parliament constituency) 1295-1885
 Shoreham (electoral division), a West Sussex County Council constituency
 Shoreham Airport
 Shoreham Airshow
 2015 Shoreham Airshow crash
 Shoreham-by-Sea railway station

United States
 Shoreham, Michigan
 Shoreham, New York
 Shoreham Nuclear Power Plant
 Shoreham station (LIRR), an abandoned Long Island Railroad station
 Shoreham, Vermont
 Omni Shoreham Hotel, Washington, D.C., US
 The Shoreham, a building in the Lakeshore East development, Chicago, Illinois, US
 New Shoreham, Rhode Island, the primary town on Block Island

Other uses
 Shoreham F.C., a football club in Shoreham-by-Sea, West Sussex
 HMS Shoreham, at least five ships of the Royal Navy
 Shoreham-class sloop, eight warships of the Royal Navy built in the 1930s

See also
 
 New Shoreham (disambiguation)
 Port Shoreham, Nova Scotia, Canada